Collins School, also known as Jamestown Township District #3 School, is a historic one-room school building located in Jamestown Township, Steuben County, Indiana. It was built in 1877, and is a one-story, rectangular, Italianate style brick building.  It has a steep gable roof topped by a square-plan belfry containing the original bell. It remained in use as a school until in 1943. It was restored in 1966–1967.

It was listed on the National Register of Historic Places in 2002.

References

One-room schoolhouses in Indiana
School buildings on the National Register of Historic Places in Indiana
Italianate architecture in Indiana
School buildings completed in 1877
Buildings and structures in Steuben County, Indiana
National Register of Historic Places in Steuben County, Indiana
1877 establishments in Indiana